Kara Tessari (born 18 March 1999) is an Australian professional basketball player.

Career

WNBL
After impressing with strong showings in the Big V with the Bulleen Boomers, Tessari would begin her professional career at a young age, stepping in mid-season to replace Jane Chalmers on the Bendigo Spirit's roster for the 2016–17 season. Joining a roster alongside the likes of Kelsey Griffin and Gabrielle Richards. 

In June 2017, Tessari rejoined the Spirit, after she had been re-signed for the 2017–18 season.

References

1999 births
Living people
Guards (basketball)
Bendigo Spirit players
Australian women's basketball players